Marinko Miletić (born 8 October 1980) is a German former professional footballer who played as a defender.

References

External links
 

1980 births
Living people
German people of Croatian descent
German footballers
Association football defenders
2. Bundesliga players
Borussia Mönchengladbach II players
FC St. Pauli players
FC Gütersloh 2000 players
Rot Weiss Ahlen players
Rot-Weiß Oberhausen players
Footballers from Düsseldorf